Žiga Repas (born 29 May 2001) is a Slovenian football midfielder who plays for NK Domžale.

References

2001 births
Living people
Footballers from Ljubljana
Slovenian footballers
Slovenia youth international footballers
Association football midfielders
NK Domžale players
NK Dob players
Slovenian PrvaLiga players
Slovenian Second League players